Parsons Boulevard is a road in Queens, New York.

Parsons Boulevard may also refer to:

Parsons Boulevard (IND Queens Boulevard Line)
Jamaica Center–Parsons/Archer (Archer Avenue lines)